Eureka is a 2020 Indian Telugu-language thriller film directed by Karteek Anand and starring Karteek Anand and Dimple Hayathi. The film follows the events at a college festival that go wrong after people split up into two factions.

Cast  
Karteek Anand as Yuva
Munna as Revanth
Dimple Hayathi as Shobitha
Shalini Vadnikatti as Jahnavi
Syed Sohel
Samiksha as Event Organizer Nav
Brahmaji as Adi Narayana
Raghu Babu as College Chairman
Sivannarayana Naripeddi as Principal Kanakaraju
Mast Ali as Kareem
Vasu Inturi as Lambu
Abhay Bethiganti as Karan
Mahesh Vitta as Satti
Rocket Raghava as Chairman P.A

Production 
Filming started in 2018 and completed in 2019. 90% of the film was shot in DRK Engineering College. The film is of the thriller genre and marks the directorial debut of the Karteek Anand.

Newcomer N. B. Vishwakanth handled the cinematography. Goodachari fame Garry BH and newcomer P. Anil Kumar edited the film. Naresh Kumaran scored the music.

Release and reception 
The film was released on 13 March 2020, but was removed from theatres two days later due to the COVID-19 pandemic.

Pathi of The Times of India gave the film a rating of three out of five stars and stated that "Director Karteek Anand, who also played a lead role, must be appreciated for trying a new genre and building a light-hearted thriller that works for the most part". A critic from 123 Telugu opined that "On the whole, Eureka is a murder mystery that has a few passable moments in the second half".

References

External links 
 

Indian thriller films
2020 films
2020 thriller films
2020 directorial debut films
2020s Telugu-language films